Coeluroides  ("hollow form") is an extinct genus of theropod dinosaur that lived during the Late Cretaceous Period in what is now India. It is based solely on the holotype caudal vertebrae GSI K27/562, K27/574 and K27/595, discovered in a layer of the Lameta Formation. The type species, C. largus, was described by Friedrich von Huene and Charles Alfred Matley in 1933.

Coeluroides was long considered a nomen dubium because of sparse remains, but a 2004 overview of Indian theropods from the Lameta Formation found it to be probably valid. An SVP 2012 abstract considers it as a possible senior synonym of Ornithomimoides.

See also
 Timeline of ceratosaur research

Jubbulpuria

References

Ceratosaurs
Dinosaurs of India and Madagascar
Late Cretaceous dinosaurs
Nomina dubia
Fossil taxa described in 1933
Taxa named by Friedrich von Huene
Taxa named by Charles Alfred Matley